Actus may refer to:

 In Ancient Rome:
An ancient Roman unit of length
Actus, path which could only have a horse cart
 Actus purus, a term employed in scholastic philosophy to express the absolute perfection of God
 Actus tragicus, another name for the Bach cantata Gottes Zeit ist die allerbeste Zeit, BWV 106
 Actus Tragicus (comics), a group of five Israeli comics artists
 A French acronym for Chadian Action for Unity and Socialism, a communist political party in Chad

See also
 Actus reus